Jónsdóttir is a surname of Icelandic origin, meaning daughter of Jón. In Icelandic names, the name is not strictly a surname, but a patronymic (see Icelandic name). The name refers to:

 Ágústína Jónsdóttir (b. 1949), Icelandic writer, artist and educator
 Anna G. Jónasdóttir (b. 1942), Icelandic political scientist and academic
Áslaug Jónsdóttir (b. 1963), Icelandic children's writer
 Auður Jónsdóttir (b. 1973), Icelandic author and freelance journalist
 Birgitta Jónsdóttir a member of parliament in Iceland and a former volunteer with WikiLeaks
 Gunnfríður Jónsdóttir (1889–1968), Icelandic sculptor
 Íeda Jónasdóttir Herman, Icelandic author and adventurer
 Jóhanna Guðrún Jónsdóttir, Icelandic singer
 Jóhanna Vala Jónsdóttir (b. 1986), Icelandic beauty queen; 2007 Miss Iceland
 Ragnheiður Jónsdóttir (1646–1715), Icelandic woman whose face is on the 5000 kronur note
 Ragnhildur Steinunn Jónsdóttir (b. 1981), Icelandic television personality; former Miss Iceland

See also
 Jónsson
 Jón

Surnames
Icelandic-language surnames